The Greek Film Critics Association Awards is one of the most important and oldest annual awards of the Greek Cinema. The awards are given out by Greek Film Critics Association and began in 1976. The PEKK gives out the awards during Thessaloniki Festival.

Best film award

See also
Hellenic Film Academy Awards
Greek State Film Awards

Sources
Πανελλήνια Ένωση Κριτικών Κινηματογράφου Φεστιβάλ Θεσσαλονίκης
In.gr Φεστιβάλ Θεσσαλονίκης, Βραβεία και βραβευθέντες 1960-2003

Greek film awards